Straža pri Raki (in older sources also Straza pri Svetem Valentinu) is a settlement east of Raka in the Municipality of Krško in eastern Slovenia. The area is part of the traditional region of Lower Carniola. It is now included with the rest of the municipality in the Lower Sava Statistical Region.

Name
The name of the settlement was changed from Straža Svetega Valentina (literally, 'Straža of St. Valentine') to Straža pri Raki (literally, 'Straža near Raka') in 1955. The name was changed on the basis of the 1948 Law on Names of Settlements and Designations of Squares, Streets, and Buildings as part of efforts by Slovenia's postwar communist government to remove religious elements from toponyms. In the past the German name was Straža bei Sankt Valentin.

Church
The local church is dedicated to Saint Valentine and belongs to the Parish of Leskovec pri Krškem. It dates to the 17th century.

References

External links
Straža pri Raki on Geopedia

Populated places in the Municipality of Krško